Hernán Darío Burbano (born 5 March 1988), popularly known by his nickname Piri, is a Colombian professional footballer who plays for Cúcuta Deportivo. He is a naturalized citizen of Mexico.

Mainly a winger, he can also operate as an attacking midfielder or second striker. His key attributes are his speed, passing and dribbling.

Career
Burbano is a product of the Deportivo Cali youth system,  and made his senior debut with Córdoba F.C. In 2008, he was scouted while he played for a local amateur football team called Deportivo Pasto, prior to joining Cali's senior side in 2011.  However, he was loaned to Cordoba Futbol Club that at the time played in Colombia's Primera B. Which soon after changed to Atletico de la Sabana, in which he continued to play. The attacking midfielder signed for Mexican side Club León in December 2011. He was one of the key players in the promotion of Club Leon back to the First Division, and a key to the Apertura 2013 championship.

Tigres UANL
In December 2013, he was transferred to Tigres UANL. On December 14, 2014, Burbano received red card just seconds after replacing teammate José Francisco Torres as a substitute in the Liga MX final. Two of his other teammates, Damian Alvarez and Nahuel Guzman also received a red card in the Liga MX final against Club America. Burbano and his club lost  3–0 against Club América.

Honours
León
Ascenso MX: Clausura 2012
Liga MX: Apertura 2013

Tigres UANL
Copa MX: Clausura 2014

References

External links

1988 births
Living people
Colombian footballers
Colombian expatriate footballers
Colombian emigrants to Mexico
Naturalized citizens of Mexico
Categoría Primera A players
Liga MX players
Ascenso MX players
Argentine Primera División players
Deportivo Pasto footballers
Deportivo Cali footballers
Club León footballers
Tigres UANL footballers
Atlético La Sabana footballers
Aldosivi footballers
Cúcuta Deportivo footballers
Association football wingers
Colombian expatriate sportspeople in Mexico
Colombian expatriate sportspeople in Argentina
Expatriate footballers in Mexico
Expatriate footballers in Argentina
Sportspeople from Cauca Department